Mostafa Mastoor (born 1964, Ahvaz) is an Iranian writer, translator and researcher. He has translated Carver's books into Persian.

His novel "Kiss the Fair Face of God" was a best-seller in Iran.

References
Entry in Zendehrood.com

Iranian translators
Iranian male short story writers
1964 births
Living people
Date of birth missing (living people)
People from Ahvaz